MV Canna is a car ferry built for Caledonian MacBrayne (CalMac) in 1975. She spent 21 years in various locations on the west of Scotland and 20 years at Rathlin Island, Northern Island, before moving to Arranmore.

History
MV Canna was the seventh of eight Island-class ferries built for Caledonian MacBrayne.

In November 2000, she was re-engined at Timbacraft, Shandon.
In May 2009, MV Canna became the first Caledonian Maritime Assets Ltd ship to receive its Inventory of Hazardous Materials (green passport).

Layout
The eight Island-class ferries, built between 1972 and 1976, were a very simple design, based on World War II landing craft. They had a two-part folding ramp at the bow, an open-plan car deck incorporating a small turntable immediately aft, and a sheltered area of passenger accommodation at the stern. The wheelhouse was above the passenger accommodation, and the main mast was above the ramp at the bow. A radar mast sat atop the bridge, just forward of the small funnel and engine exhaust.

Service
MV Canna entered service with CalMac on the Raasay route in January 1976, initially from Portree, but this soon changed to a shorter crossing from Sconser. After only 3 months, she was moved to the Lochaline crossing to Mull, where she remained for the next 10 years. In 1986, MV Loch Linnhe and then the larger  replaced Canna. After two years as spare vessel, Canna spent seven years crossing between Kyles Scalpay on Harris and the slipway on Scalpay - a crossing of just three minutes.

In April 1997, she took over the Ballycastle - Rathlin Island crossing in Northern Ireland, replacing . She was  operated by CalMac until 2008, when  Rathlin Island Ferry Ltd took over the service, leasing the vessel from Caledonian Maritime Assets. After 20 years, in 2017, Canna was replaced by a new vessel, Spirit of Rathlin.

She was bought for service at Arranmore in County Donegal, Ireland, before April 2018. By January 2020, she had been upgraded for the Arranmore service along with fellow Island-class ferries, Rhum, and Morvern.

References

Caledonian MacBrayne
Ferries of Northern Ireland
1975 ships
Ships built on the River Clyde